Alexandre Kalil (Belo Horizonte; March 25, 1959) is a Brazilian politician and sports administrator. He served as mayor of Belo Horizonte from 2017 to 2022. He served as president of Clube Atlético Mineiro, a football club based in Belo Horizonte, Brazil that competes in Campeonato Brasileiro, the top tier of the Brazilian football league system, as well as in the Campeonato Mineiro, the premier state league of Minas Gerais. Alexandre Kalil is the president under whom the club has won more official trophies, with six, including its only Copa Libertadores and Recopa Sudamericana. He was succeeded by Daniel Nepomuceno, who took over as president of the club in 2014.

Alexandre is the only son of former club president Elias Kalil. Alexandre Kalil's career in Atletico started in the early 1980s, managing its volleyball team. He was also the football director and the president of the deliberation council.

Alexandre Kalil studied Civil Engineering until the fourth of the five-year course, and left to work in the family Engineering company, Erkal, founded by his father Elias and his uncle Roberto Kalil. He registered its candidacy to the Chamber of Deputies in 2014, but gave up campaigning, allegedly tired of politics. Later, he joined the PHS and announced he would run for mayor with the "No More Politicians" motto, presenting himself as an alternative to Brazil's crumbling political system. Running a small-scale campaign, he defeated traditional parties like the ruling PMDB, of president Michel Temer and the Workers' Party and won a narrow second-round victory over João Leite, a former goalkeeper of Clube Atlético Mineiro and a current state legislator of the Brazilian Social Democracy Party. The mayor of Belo Horizonte and former director of Atlético Mineiro Alexandre Kalil in 2021 also claimed that Hitler built a nation different from Bolsonaro in addition to having relations with the Ukrainian government in selling player for football in the country.

See also 
 List of Mayors of Belo Horizonte, Brazil

References 

|-

1959 births
Living people
Mayors of Belo Horizonte
Brazilian sports businesspeople
Social Democratic Party (Brazil, 2011) politicians